The Moringuidae are a small family of eels commonly known as spaghetti eels or worm eels, although the latter name is also shared with other families of eels.

Moringuid eels are found in shallow tropical waters worldwide.

The family contains 14 species in its two genera.

References

 
Marine fish families
Eels
Ray-finned fish families